Mauler (an acronym for Mobile Armored Utility Laser-guided E-beam, Revised) is a name used by four fictional characters appearing in American comic books published by Marvel Comics.

Publication history
The first version appears in Daredevil #167 (Nov. 1980) and was created by David Michelinie and Frank Miller. The first version received an entry in The Official Handbook of the Marvel Universe Deluxe Edition #18

The second character first appears in Iron Man #156 (March 1982) and was created by David Michelinie; John Romita Jr. and Pablo Marcos.

Fictional character biography

Aaron Soames
Aaron Soames was an elderly, former employee of Cord Conglomerate deprived of his pension benefits by a computer error. Soames stole the prototype suit of Mauler armor in the hopes of punishing Edwin Cord who was indifferent to Soames' plight. Soames had two skirmishes with the hero Daredevil, and after humiliating Cord by symbolically erasing his existence as well by destroying his driver's license, credit cards and other means of personal identification (he did not intend to do him any actual harm), he was killed with advanced weaponry by Cord's men. Daredevil was one of the few mourners at Soames' funeral.

Turk Barrett

The Mauler armor reappears when small-time criminal Turk Barrett steals the armor and attempts to kill Daredevil. Barrett is defeated in seconds by Daredevil.

Brendan Doyle
Later, mercenary Brendan Doyle was hired by the now imprisoned Edwin Cord to steal the armor from Stark International (the company of Iron Man's alter ego Tony Stark) and destroy all records of the suit design and history. Although successful in stealing the suit, Doyle was prevented from reaching the records by former comrade Jim Rhodes, and decided to keep the suit. As a soldier for hire, Doyle battled the heroes Spider-Man and Wonder Man, and encountered Spider-Man once again while trying to retrieve his infant son. Doyle reappeared during the Armor Wars when the Mauler armour was confiscated by Iron Man, who was tracking down technology based on his stolen designs.

Doyle eventually gained a new Mauler suit and battled the Canadian superhero team Alpha Flight. Jim Rhodes briefly impersonated the Mauler. Doyle returned during the Civil War caused by the Superhuman Registration Act, and encountered the Avengers.

Brendan Doyle was later recruited by Mandarin and Zeke Stane to join the other Iron Man villains in a plot to take down Iron Man.

Following the death of his 5-year-old son Danny, who had been placed for adoption, in a car accident, Doyle kidnapped a young boy named Bobby Morris under the delusion that he was Danny. Doyle was found by Hyperion, and attempted to use the Mauler suit to kill him until Hyperion managed to persuade him to stop and surrender to the authorities.

Fourth incarnation
Roderick Kingsley later sold one of the Mauler armors to an unnamed criminal. This version of Mauler is seen on Kingsley's side at the time when the Hobgoblin (who was actually the butler Claude) was leading his forces into attacking the Goblin King's Goblin Nation. After Hobgoblin was killed by Goblin King, Mauler was among the villains that defected to the Goblin Underground.

Powers and abilities
The Mauler armor provides heavy protection from physical and energy-based attacks, boosts the wearer's strength and courtesy of turbines allows flight. In addition to internal life support systems, a laser cannon that doubles as an electron particle gun is mounted on the left arm. The right palm of the armor can also generate a high-frequency electric shock.

In other media

Video games
 The Brendan Doyle version of Mauler appears in the PSP and Wii versions of the Iron Man 2 video game, voiced by Steven Blum. Mauler appears on the S.H.I.E.L.D. Helicarrier initiating Kearson DeWitt's plan to down the aircraft using bombs. Iron Man disarms the bombs and eventually defeats Mauler. Mauler carries a bomb which Iron Man blasts to defeat Mauler. He then fights and defeats Mauler once again disarming multiple bombs in the process.

References

External links
 Mauler (disambiguation) at Marvel.com
 

Comics characters introduced in 1980
Comics characters introduced in 1982
Marvel Comics supervillains
Characters created by Frank Miller (comics)
Characters created by David Michelinie
Characters created by John Romita Jr.
Fictional mercenaries in comics